Less Than Kind is a 2008–2013 Canadian television comedy-drama series that stars Jesse Camacho as Sheldon Blecher, a teenager growing up in a loving but dysfunctional Jewish family in Winnipeg. The show's cast also includes Maury Chaykin and Wendel Meldrum as Sheldon's parents, Benjamin Arthur as his older brother Josh, and Nancy Sorel as his aunt Clara. The Blechers struggle to operate a driving school out of their home in Winnipeg's fading North End. Less Than Kind made its debut October 13, 2008, on Citytv, and moved to HBO Canada in February 2010.

The ensemble cast of the critically acclaimed series won Canadian Comedy Awards in 2009 and 2010. Less Than Kind received the 2010 Gemini Award for Best Comedy Program or Series and the inaugural award for Best Comedy Series at the 1st Canadian Screen Awards.

The title sequence and logo for Less Than Kind were inspired by an iconic highway sign at Winnipeg's Confusion Corner intersection, depicting arrows pointing in every direction.

The name of the series is found in the first line spoken by Hamlet (Act 1, Scene 2): "A little more than kin, and less than kind."

Cast
Maury Chaykin as Sam Blecher (father) - Season 1 & 2
Wendel Meldrum as Anne Blecher (mother)
Benjamin Arthur as Josh Blecher (older brother)
Jesse Camacho as Sheldon Blecher (younger brother)
Lisa Durupt as Shandra (Josh's girlfriend/wife)
Brooke Palsson as Miriam Goldstein (Sheldon's friend/girlfriend)
Tyler Johnston as Danny Lubbe (Sheldon/Miriam's friend) - Season 2 - 4
Nancy Sorel as Clara Fine (Anne's sister)
Emma Bambrick as Imelda Amahit (Sheldon's love interest) - Season 1

Production

Less Than Kind was created by Marvin Kaye and Chris Sheasgreen, who loosely based the series on Kaye's successful one-act play, They Have Mayonnaise in Montreal. "I liked the characters and liked that it was kind of based on Marvin's life," said showrunner Mark McKinney. "It had a ring of truth to it, had heart.... It was pretty easy to climb on board."

The series was produced for City by Buffalo Gal Pictures and Breakthrough Films & Television. It was originally announced as part of Citytv's 2007 schedule, but was delayed because CTVglobemedia's acquisition of CHUM Limited and subsequent sale of Citytv to Rogers Media necessitated that the two companies sort out programming rights between Citytv and its former sister network A-Channel. The series made its debut October 13, 2008. For the second season, the show moved to HBO Canada.

Following Chaykin's death in July 2010, the show's producers announced that production on the third season would be delayed, but that the show would continue. Production of the third season began in November 2010, with directors including James Dunnison, Bruce McDonald, Mark McKinney, Kelly Makin, Douglas Mitchell and Gary Yates.

The fourth and final season of Less Than Kind was filmed in Winnipeg May 28 – July 10, 2012, for broadcast in 2013. "We are all thrilled to be doing a fourth season that offers the creative challenge of concluding this story and this wonderful series," said executive producer Mark McKinney.

Broadcast history
The first season of Less Than Kind premiered on October 13, 2008, on Citytv. The show's second season premiered on Friday, February 19, 2010, at 8:30 p.m. ET/MT on HBO Canada, a multiplex channel of The Movie Network and Movie Central. In June 2010 it was announced that HBO Canada had picked up the show for a third season.

Distributed by Breakthrough Entertainment, Less Than Kind began airing on South Africa Sony Entertainment Television in the fall of 2009. In late 2009 the series began airing on Anixe HD in Germany.

The US debut was scheduled for DirecTV's Audience Network on November 3, 2011. DirecTV acquired all 3 seasons.

The series' final episode aired on July 14, 2013.

Home video releases

In September 2012, Less Than Kind was one of the three titles chosen to launch Breakthrough Entertainment's newly established online distribution division, Breakthrough Home Entertainment. The first season of the series was offered for sale as a three-disc DVD set available for Canadian purchasers only.

Reception
The first episode drew 47,000 viewers.

Reviews and commentary
 Vanessa Farquharson, National Post (August 21, 2008) — Refreshingly edgy.... The episodes all come together in something that might be called an organized mess. Multiple plot lines get tangled, supporting characters come and go, but ultimately there's a strong core of actors holding this together. They know when to improvise and when to stick to the script, and they realize Winnipeg is not Los Angeles, and that this is a good thing — Less Than Kind is far from predictable Hollywood pap.
Amber Dowling, TV Guide (September 8, 2008) — Less Than Kind is the kind of show you actually want to watch with your family.
Joshua Ostroff, Eye Weekly (October 8, 2008) — Less Than Kind is about a perpetual-winter Winnipeg as seen from the perspective of fat-but-brilliant 15-year-old Sheldon Blecher (the impressive-beyond-his-years Jesse Camacho), who balances self-loathing with a pride in his own intelligence. ... The show's melancholic humour and near-perfect casting for its array of sweet-natured outsiders comes from creator Marvin Kaye, who expanded the semi-autobiographical series from his one-act play, and exec producer Mark McKinney (The Kids in the Hall, Slings & Arrows). The Weakerthans supply a perfect theme song.
 Rob Salem, Toronto Star (October 13, 2008) — It is some small comfort, as we begin the big adieu tonight for the final season of the much-admired Corner Gas, that just one hour later on Citytv, we are introduced to another mid-country comedy that could well be its successor, Less Than Kind. And, in a further vote of confidence, the show has already been picked up for a second season even before the first of these initial 13 hits the air. ...  Again, the comedy is character-driven, in this case by the only somewhat less overtly eccentric members of the Blecher family, focusing on the younger son, Sheldon, embodied — and then some — by plus-sized 17-year-old Jesse Camacho, who often almost eerily evokes a young John Candy. Except in his scenes with Blecher patriarch Maury Chaykin, an endearingly shady driving instructor. Together onscreen, they could not be any closer than acorn to tree. ... It is Camacho and Chaykin, together, separately and in combination with the others, who make this wonky domestic sitcom work.
 Kate Taylor, The Globe and Mail (October 13, 2008) — Less Than Kind features the Blechers, a Jewish family in Winnipeg whose members include a scheming dad, a pyromaniacal mother, a nymphomaniacal aunt and two mismatched brothers. The first is a self-absorbed, failed actor; the second is a sympathetic teenage fat boy and the show's protagonist. With confident performances from Maury Chaykin as the irascible dad who operates a driving school on barter, and Jesse Camacho as the put-upon but surprisingly mature nerd trying to juggle girls and school, Less Than Kind also offers a strong ensemble — and the occasional flash of comic brilliance. The family with the pyromaniac mum is trying to get its son bar-mitzvahed at a synagogue that is under repairs after a mysterious fire.
 Joel Rubinoff, Waterloo Record (October 25, 2008) — One of the edgiest Canadian comedies in recent history.... Less Than Kind is different. Not only does it boast the acerbic wit of its producer, former Kid in the Hall Mark McKinney, but as a low-budget Canadian show that flies stealthily under the radar, it's fearless.
 Andrew Ryan, The Globe and Mail (November 7, 2008) — What happens in Winnipeg stays in Winnipeg on this engaging homegrown series. Montreal native Jesse Camacho is a true find as the lovable loser Sheldon Blecher.
Alison Gillmor, CBC News (November 17, 2008) — Less Than Kind, which has already been picked up for a second season, works because it integrates Winnipeg's crowded past with a fierce, funny and generous look at a timeless situation. Fifteen-year-old Sheldon Blecher (played by the tremendously appealing Jesse Camacho) is an old soul in Husky Boy jeans; he is the only grownup in a completely loopy family. Father Sam (played by Maury Chaykin, once again proving he is Canada's best character actor) is perpetually furious, constantly scheming. Warm, well-meaning mother Anne (Wendel Meldrum) handles her stress with a touch of pyromania.... Like its opening theme song — the Weakerthans’ "One Great City," with its plaintive "I hate Winnipeg" refrain — the show takes complaints and carping and turns them into anguished love.
 John Doyle, The Globe and Mail (December 24, 2010) — Strange and lovely, anchored in the poetry of the ordinary, this finespun comedy set in Winnipeg has had a life more eventful than most of its plotlines. First aired but ignored on the City TV channels, it came back for a second season on HBO Canada, got quiet acclaim and then suffered the death of one of its mainstays, actor Maury Chaykin. Long may it continue its loopy, warm meandering.

Awards and nominations
Over the four seasons of the series, it received 55 nominations, earning 16 wins, including recognition from the Leo Awards, Canadian Comedy Awards, Directors Guild of Canada, Writers Guild of Canada, Gemini Awards, ACTRA Awards, Canadian Cinema Editors awards, Young Artist Awards, and Canadian Screen Awards.

References

External links

 

Citytv original programming
2000s Canadian comedy-drama television series
2010s Canadian comedy-drama television series
2008 Canadian television series debuts
2013 Canadian television series endings
Television shows set in Manitoba
Television shows filmed in Winnipeg
Gemini and Canadian Screen Award for Best Comedy Series winners
Crave original programming
Driver's education
Audience (TV network) original programming
Jewish Canadian culture
Television series about Jews and Judaism
Television series by Breakthrough Entertainment